Westminster Academy is a private, classical Christian school serving grades JK-12 in Memphis, Tennessee, USA. It is a charter member of the Association of Classical and Christian Schools, accredited by SAIS, and also holds membership in the Association of Christian Schools International. The school has been named in The Commercial Appeal top workplaces for five consecutive years.

The school offers a variety of sporting activities including but not limited to, soccer,tennis, and basketball for both boys and girls.

References

External links 
Westminster Academy
Association of Classical & Christian Schools
CiRCE Institute

Christian schools in Tennessee
Classical Christian schools
Educational institutions established in 1996
Preparatory schools in Tennessee
Private K-12 schools in Tennessee
Schools in Memphis, Tennessee
1996 establishments in Tennessee